is a Japanese animation studio established on July 7, 2011. It is best known for co-animating series with Studio Gokumi such as Pandora in the Crimson Shell: Ghost Urn, Seiren, and Ms. Koizumi Loves Ramen Noodles, as well as animating Wagamama High Spec as its first own work.

Works

Television series

OVA

Films

References

External links

 

 
Animation studios in Tokyo
Anime companies
Japanese companies established in 2011
Film production companies of Japan
Japanese animation studios
Mass media companies established in 2011
Suginami